The Newton Street Bridge is a historic bridge carrying Newton Street over the Charles River in Waltham, Massachusetts.  The stone arch bridge was built in 1877 on the site of Waltham's first bridge, which was built c. 1761–62.  It was designed by Hiram Blaisdell, a specialist in the design of masonry bridges.  It consists of three elliptical arch segments on granite piers.  The arches are formed of granite voussoirs, and the facing of the bridge is predominantly rough rock.  It is the only 19th-century bridge in Waltham to escape significant alteration.

The bridge was listed on the National Register of Historic Places in 1989.

See also
List of bridges on the National Register of Historic Places in Massachusetts
National Register of Historic Places listings in Waltham, Massachusetts

References

Road bridges on the National Register of Historic Places in Massachusetts
Bridges completed in 1877
Bridges in Middlesex County, Massachusetts
Buildings and structures in Waltham, Massachusetts
National Register of Historic Places in Waltham, Massachusetts
Bridges over the Charles River
Stone arch bridges in the United States
1877 establishments in Massachusetts